Aethiophysa consimilis is a moth in the family Crambidae. It is found in North America, where it has been recorded from Alabama, Maryland, Mississippi, North Carolina, Ohio, South Carolina, Tennessee, Texas and West Virginia.

References

Moths described in 1964
Glaphyriinae
Moths of North America